is a district located in Aomori Prefecture, Japan.  It occupies the southeast corner of the prefecture, bordering Iwate Prefecture.

As of 1 June 2019, the district has an estimated population of 63,205 and a density of 65.2 persons per km2. The total area was 969.34 km2. In terms of national politics, the district is represented in the Diet of Japan's House of Representatives as a part of the Aomori 2nd district.

Towns and villages
The district currently consists of five towns and one village. The city of Hachinohe was formerly part of the district.

Gonohe
Hashikami
Nanbu
Sannohe
Takko
Shingō

History
During the Edo period, the area was part of the Morioka han feudal domain of the Nanbu clan, with portions belonging to Hachinohe Domain and Shichinohe Domain. 
 
The Nanbu clan sided with the Ōuetsu Reppan Dōmei during the Boshin War of the Meiji Restoration and were punished by the new Meiji government by loss of their northern territories. In November 1869, large portions of Kita-gun (Shimokita and Kamikita) and Sannohe District became part of the newly created , a 30,000 koku holding created to resettle the dispossessed Matsudaira clan from Aizu-Wakamatsu. In July 1871, with the abolition of the han system, Tonami Domain became Tonami Prefecture, and was merged into the newly created Aomori Prefecture in September 1871.

During the early Meiji period cadastral reform of April 1, 1889, the district was reorganized into two towns and 31 villages.

References

Districts in Aomori Prefecture